Dédalo (Spanish for Daedalus) was the name of two ships of the Spanish Navy:

  was a seaplane and balloon carrier converted from German cargo ship Neuenfels in 1922

Spanish Navy ship names